Bunonematidae is a family of nematodes in the order Rhabditida.

References 

 De Ley, P.; Blaxter, M. L. (2004). A new system for Nematoda: combining morphological characters with molecular trees, and translating clades into ranks and taxa. Nematology Monographs & Perspectives. 2: 633–653.

External links 

 

 
Nematode families